Bluefield Solar Income Fund is a large British investment trust. Established in 2013, it is dedicated to investing in low-carbon assets in the UK. The chairman is John Rennocks. It is listed on the London Stock Exchange and it is a constituent of the FTSE 250 Index. 

The company was the subject of an initial public offering on the London Stock Exchange when it raised £130 million in July 2013. The company acquired a portfolio of six solar farms and two wind farms from Good Energy Group in January 2022 and went on to buy another 15 solar farms and 4 wind farms in May 2022. The company raised a further £150 million with a view to acquiring further assets in June 2022.

References

External links
 Official site

Investment trusts of the United Kingdom